The spothead lantern fish (Diaphus metopoclampus), also called the bluntnose lanternfish, is a species of fish in the family Myctophidae (lanternfish).

Its specific name is from Ancient Greek μέτωπον (metōpon, "forehead") and λαμπάς (lampas, "lantern").

Description
It has a deep and short head and prominent photophores in its head.

Habitat

Behaviour

References

Myctophidae
Fish described in 1829
Taxa named by Anastasio Cocco